Kattil Madam Temple is a dilapidated shrine in the Palakkad district in Kerala, India. It is thought to be a Jain temple built around the ninth or tenth centuries AD and is situated on the Pattambi Guruvayur road.

Architecture 
The architecture is of Dravidian style with Chola and Pandya influences. The temple features an alpa-vimana.

The temple is protected by the Archaeological Survey of India.

References

Citation

Sources

External links
 

Jain temples in Kerala
Religious buildings and structures in Palakkad district
Monuments of National Importance in Kerala
9th-century Jain temples